The Boss DS-1 is a distortion pedal for guitar, manufactured by the Roland Corporation under the brand name Boss since 1978. The first distortion effects unit made by Boss, it has become a classic effect, used by many notable guitar players.

Boss released a successor, the DS-2. The DS-2, "Turbo Distortion" was released in 1987, and is very similar to the DS-1 except that it features a "turbo" setting, which produces a sharper midrange tone. Boss released a black limited edition 40th Anniversary model of the DS-1 in 2017.

Notable users
Bruce Kulick
Chuck Schuldiner
Dave Navarro
Doug Aldrich
Gary Moore
George Lynch
Joe Satriani
John Frusciante
Kurt Cobain
Luca Bob Gotti
Mark Speer
Matthias Jabs
Mike Stern
Peter Steele
Roger Spinnela
Steve Rothery
Steve Vai

References

Boss Corporation
Effects units
Amplified instruments
Japanese inventions
Japanese musical instruments
Musical instruments invented in the 1970s